Sorkh Qaleh-ye Kordha (also Romanized as Sorkh Qal‘eh-ye Kordhā; also known as Karīmābād-e Soflá) is a village in Milanlu Rural District, in the Central District of Esfarayen County, North Khorasan Province, Iran. At the 2006 census, its population was 106, in 27 families.

References 

Populated places in Esfarayen County